Boronia decumbens is a plant in the citrus family Rutaceae and is endemic to northern parts of the Northern Territory. It is a low, spreading shrub with pinnate leaves and white to pink flowers with the four sepals larger than the four petals.

Description
Its branches and leaves and some flower parts are moderately hairy. The flowers are sessile and arranged singly in leaf axils. The flowers are white to pink, the sepals larger than the petals. Flowering occurs from November to August.

Taxonomy and naming
Boronia decumbens was first formally described in 1997 by Marco Duretto who published the description in  Nuytsia. The specific epithet (decumbens) is a Latin word meaning "lying down" or "reclining", referring to the usual habit of this species.

Distribution and habitat
This boronia grows in woodland in Kakadu National Park north of the Mary River and the Waterfall Creek turnoff.

References 

decumbens
Flora of the Northern Territory
Plants described in 1997
Taxa named by Marco Duretto